Deroca pulla is a moth in the family Drepanidae. It was described by Watson in 1957. It is found in the Chinese provinces of Sichuan and Hubei.

References

Moths described in 1957
Drepaninae